Sluggan Bridge is a bridge across the River Dulnain.

History
The present bridge replaces a two-arched bridge of  span built by George Wade as part of a military road. The old bridge was washed away in the floods of 1829, and the present one put up some time after.

Design
It has a single arch of  span, and rises high above the flat ground around it. Despite being more modern than many other stone bridges, Sluggan bridge is of a more old-fashioned construction.

References

Listed bridges in Scotland
Category A listed buildings in Highland (council area)
Bridges in Highland (council area)